Marcel Francois Chagnon (born February 9, 1975), known professionally as Marcel, is an American country music singer, songwriter, and music video director. Signed to Mercury Nashville Records in 2003, he released his debut album You, Me, and the Windshield that year and charted on the Billboard Hot Country Songs charts with the single "Country Rock Star". Five years later, he signed to Lyric Street Records and released the single "I Love This Song", which has also charted. In addition to his recording career, Marcel has directed several music videos, and has written charted singles for Josh Gracin, Trace Adkins, and Jessica Andrews, to whom he is married.

Career 
Born in Grosse Pointe, Michigan, Marcel was a semi-pro hockey player until signing with Mercury Nashville Records in 2002. For four years prior to this, while waiting for an opportunity, he sang at clubs, bars, and waited tables for extra money.

In 2003, he released his debut album You, Me and the Windshield. The tracks "Country Rock Star" and "Tennessee" from this album were released as singles. After this he returned to writing songs for other artists.

Marcel has co-written two of Josh Gracin's singles: "Nothin' to Lose", which previously appeared on You, Me and the Windshield, and "Favorite State of Mind". Jessica Andrews also released two of his songs as singles: "There's More to Me Than You" and "Everything". Rascal Flatts, LeAnn Rimes, and Big & Rich have also recorded his songs.

In 2008, Marcel signed to Lyric Street Records, releasing his third single, "I Love This Song" that year. When the song failed to reach Top 40, he exited Lyric Street's roster. In February 2009, he signed to the Red Stripe Plane label. He had a cameo in Hannah Montana: The Movie, playing guitar in Billy Ray Cyrus' band. He is also shown in Cyrus' video for "Back to Tennessee".

On February 17, 2009, Marcel released his fourth single, "Believin'", which is also the title track to his second album. The album was released on the Red Stripe Plane label, but neither the album or single charted on any Billboard chart.  In June 2010, Marcel released a new single titled "It's Summertime." Later in the year, Marcel began directing music videos for other artists.

Personal life
Marcel became engaged to Jessica Andrews in October 2010, and the two were married on November 11, 2011. Andrews gave birth to the couple's son Rockwell Francois Chagnon on February 6, 2018.

Discography

Studio albums

Singles

Music videos

Music videos directed
32 music videos are currently listed here.

References

External links
Official Site

American country harmonica players
American country singer-songwriters
Living people
Singer-songwriters from Michigan
People from Grosse Pointe, Michigan
American music video directors
Mercury Records artists
Lyric Street Records artists
1975 births
Country musicians from Michigan
21st-century American singers